Ai Sugiyama was the defending champion, but lost in the quarterfinals to Amélie Mauresmo.

Mauresmo went on to win the title, defeating Elena Bovina in the final 6–2, 6–0. This is, to date, Bovina's final WTA tour final.

Seeds
The top four seeds who played received a bye into the second round.

Draw

Finals

Top half

Bottom half

Qualifying

Seeds

Qualifiers

Lucky losers

Draw

First qualifier

Second qualifier

Third qualifier

Fourth qualifier

References
 Main and Qualifying Draws (WTA Archive)

Generali Ladies Linz - Singles